Diachrysia balluca, the green-patched looper, is a moth of the family Noctuidae. The species was first described by Carl Geyer in 1832. It is found in north-eastern North America from Nova Scotia west to Manitoba and south to western North Carolina. Great Smoky Mountains National Park is the southern limit of this species. The only other records in the south are from the type locality of Georgia and a record from Liberty County in north-western Florida. These possibly represent strays.

The wingspan is about 45 mm. Adults are on wing from June to September.

The larvae mostly feed on woody plants, including Humulus lupulus, Populus tremuloides, Laportea canadensis and Rubus.

References

Plusiinae
Moths of North America
Moths described in 1832
Taxa named by Carl Geyer